The 1986–87 Middle Tennessee Blue Raiders men's basketball team represented Middle Tennessee State University during the 1986–87 NCAA Division I men's basketball season. The Blue Raiders, led by first-year head coach Bruce Stewart, played their home games at the Murphy Center in Murfreesboro, Tennessee and were members of the Ohio Valley Conference. They finished the season 22–7, 11–3 in OVC play to finish atop the regular season standings. In the OVC tournament, they were upset by Austin Peay in the semifinals, but did receive an at-large bid to the NCAA tournament. As the No. 12 seed in the West region, they were defeated by No. 5 seed Notre Dame, 84–71, in the opening round.

Roster

Schedule and results

|-
!colspan=9 style=| Regular season

|-
!colspan=9 style=| OVC tournament

|-
!colspan=9 style=| NCAA tournament

References

Middle Tennessee Blue Raiders men's basketball seasons
Middle Tennessee
Middle Tennessee
Middle Tennessee Blue Raiders
Middle Tennessee Blue Raiders